Kappa Kappa Gamma, also known simply as Kappa or KKG, is a collegiate sorority founded at Monmouth College in Monmouth, Illinois, United States.

It has a membership of more than 260,000 women, with 140 collegiate chapters in the United States and Canada and 307 alumni associations worldwide.

It is sometimes referred to by its original designation, a women's fraternity, as it was founded before the term "sorority" was coined. It is a founding member of the National Panhellenic Conference (NPC), an umbrella organization that includes 26 American sororities.

History

In 1869, two students at Monmouth College in Monmouth, Illinois, Mary Louise Bennett and Hannah Jeannette Boyd, were dissatisfied with the fact that, while men enjoyed membership in fraternities, women had few equivalent organizations for companionship, support, and advancement, and were instead limited to literary societies. Bennett and Boyd decided to create a women's fraternity and sought members "not only for literary work, but also for social development", beginning with their friend Mary Moore Stewart. Stewart, Boyd, and Bennett met in the Amateurs des Belles Lettres Hall, a literary society of which the women were active members, to plan their new society. They recruited three additional women, Anna Elizabeth Willits, Martha Louisa Stevenson, and Susan Burley Walker, to join in founding the fraternity.

The six founders met at Willit's home to begin work on establishing the Alpha chapter of Kappa Kappa Gamma. They chose a golden key as their badge and had badges crafted by Bennett's family jeweler for their official debut. A formal charter for the fraternity was drawn up by Stewart's father, who was an attorney in the state of Illinois. On October 13, 1870, the founders publicized their intention to organize as a women's fraternity by entering the Monmouth Chapel, a public campus venue, wearing their golden key badges in their hair. Although the groundwork of the organization began as early as 1869, the 1876 Convention voted to recognize  as the official Founders Day since no earlier charter date could be determined.

In 1871, the fraternity chartered its Beta chapter at nearby St. Mary's Seminary. The next year, the fraternity opened its Gamma chapter at Smithson College and Delta chapter at Indiana University. Though the Beta and Gamma chapters failed to survive more than a few years, the Delta chapter became the fraternity's oldest continuously active chapter (Alpha was temporarily closed in 1874 but later re-established) and contributed a great deal to the organization of the fraternity in its early years.

In 1882, Kappa Kappa Gamma was the first women's fraternity to publish The Key, a quarterly journal. Today, it is published triennially through Watkins Printing Company.

In 1890, the Beta Alpha chapter of Kappa Kappa Gamma became the first sorority at the University of Pennsylvania, an Ivy League university in Philadelphia, led by president Martha Bunting

Moves Toward Panhellenic 
In 1891, Kappa Kappa Gamma invited the other women's fraternities to Boston for a discussion on the challenges they collectively faced, which was the precursor to the National Panhellenic Conference. However, no major movements occurred from this meeting, and none would occur for another decade when Alpha Phi invited Pi Beta Phi, Kappa Alpha Theta, Kappa Kappa Gamma, Delta Gamma, Gamma Phi Beta, Delta Delta Delta, Alpha Chi Omega, and Chi Omega to a conference in Chicago on May 24, 1902, to set standards for collegiate sororities. This meeting resulted in the organization of the first inter-fraternity association and the first intergroup organization on college campuses.

In the 1960s, G. William Domhoff, writing in Who Rules America?, listed Kappa Kappa Gamma as one of "the four or five sororities with nationwide prestige."

From 1929 to 1952, the organization was headquartered in the Law and Finance Building in Downtown Columbus, Ohio. In 1952, Kappa Kappa Gamma purchased its first headquarters at 530 East Town Street, now part of the East Town Street Historic District. On January 2, 2018, Kappa Kappa Gamma moved from the building to 6640 Riverside Drive in Dublin, Ohio.

Symbols

Kappa Kappa Gamma's official colors are light blue and dark blue, with the owl as its official mascot. The fraternity flower, the fleur-de-lis, combines the fraternity's colors of dark blue and light blue. Since the fleur-de-lis is a mythical symbol, the iris is often substituted for practical purposes. The fraternity jewel is the blue sapphire. The sapphire is recognized as a symbol of truth, sincerity, and constancy. The fraternity Coat of Arms combines all of the fraternity's symbols: the key, the Greek letters, the new-member pin, the fleur-de-lis, the owl, and the head of Minerva.

Kappa Kappa Gamma used "Tradition of Leadership" as a tagline in many previous fraternity publications, but, as of June 2012, the new fraternity tagline was changed to "Aspire to Be".

In June 2018, an announcement was made that a new brand would be rolled out during the 2018-2019 academic year with the tag line "Dream Boldly, Live Fully".

Badges
The badge of membership is the golden key. The standard badge is one inch in length and is sometimes jeweled with sapphires, pearls or diamonds. On the front of the key are the Greek letters ΚΚΓ (on the stem) and ΑΩΟ (on the ward). Often the initials and initiation date of the member to whom the badge belongs are inscribed on the back of the badge. The original keys were larger and were not standardized; many were specially made to the member's specifications, sometimes including stones such as opals. They were also worn on members' lapels, foreheads or hair, whereas today, badges are uniformly worn on the left side of the chest. The badge is worn strictly as an emblem of membership by initiated members. The fraternity encourages badges to be returned to the headquarters upon a member's death.

New, uninitiated members of Kappa Kappa Gamma wear a different badge, which is a sigma within a delta enameled on silver in the two colors of the fraternity, dark blue and light blue. The new member pin is only worn during the new member period, after which it is returned to the initiating chapter.

Programs

Philanthropy
Kappa Kappa Gamma supports a three-part Philanthropy program, often referred to as "Philanthropy 1-2-3".

 The first branch of philanthropy supports the Kappa family through the Kappa Kappa Gamma Foundation, which provides funding for Kappa museums, members-only scholarships, educational and leadership programming, and the Rose McGill fund, which provides emergency financial aid to sisters in need.
 The second branch supports the local community by encouraging chapters and alumnae associations to volunteer and raise money for charities in their regions.
 The third branch encompasses the entire fraternity through its national philanthropy, Reading is Fundamental (RIF). The fraternity officially adopted RIF, which works to promote literacy in children, as the national philanthropy in 2004.

Local KKG chapters may support other foundations or philanthropies individually.

 Starting in 2021, Kappa Kappa Gamma has nationally split from Reading is Fundamental and has announced their new national philanthropy: Mental Health and Well-Being.

Leadership
Collegiate chapters contain a governing body of members that include a President, Treasurer, Secretary, and officers assigned to chapter functions such as membership, standards, events, and philanthropy. Often these officers supervise committees as well. The chapter officers are advised by and report to alumnae volunteers who serve as chapter advisors, traveling Leadership Consultants, and Fraternity Council officers.

The national Fraternity Council consists of six elected alumnae (the President, four Vice Presidents, and Treasurer) and two non-voting members (the National Panhellenic Conference Delegate, and the Fraternity Executive Director). Their work is supported by 11 Content Directors, 14 District Directors, dozens of Content Specialists, various committees, and Kappa Kappa Gamma Headquarters staff. As of January 2018, the Fraternity moved their headquarters from Columbus, Ohio to a new facility in Dublin, Ohio.

In 2004, Leadership Academy began offering undergraduate and alumna members intensive leadership development at an outdoor weekend retreat. Programming for the Leadership Academy has been developed in partnership with The Tompeters! Company and Bradford Woods, an outdoor education facility in Indiana. More recently, Leadership Academy has taken place at Heartland Conference Retreat Center in Marengo, Ohio, near the Fraternity Headquarters.

The Monmouth Duo
The women's fraternity Pi Beta Phi was founded as I.C. Sorosis at Monmouth College in 1867. Kappa Kappa Gamma was founded at the college in 1870, and in 1888 I.C. Sorosis adopted Greek letters and changed its name to Pi Beta Phi. Because both fraternities have their origins at the same college within three years of one another, they are often called "The Monmouth Duo". On campuses with Pi Beta Phi and Kappa Kappa Gamma chapters, the groups often hold joint social and philanthropic events.

Controversies

Racism

In 2018, the Kappa Kappa Gamma chapter at the University of New Mexico in Albuquerque was under fire for making racist comments during a Greek Life welcome event. The Vice President of Black Brothers Cultivating Knowledge alleged that the sorority girls behind him said "'Black people, get away from me" and "Black people stop wearing grills" while a black woman was speaking.

In 2020, the Kappa Kappa Gamma chapter at the Indiana University Bloomington in Bloomington, Indiana was suspended partially due to the blatant mistreatment of the only black member in the house.

Hazing

In 1997, the television show 20/20 featured an exposé on hazing in the sorority system that included a hazing by three members of Kappa Kappa Gamma at DePauw University in Greenpaw, Indiana, and a local sorority Lambda Delta Sigma at Concordia College in Saint Paul, Minnesota. The three members of Kappa Kappa Gamma, on November 6, 1997, were accused of branding three pledges with cigarettes in a family hazing rite after a night of heavy drinking. After being burned, the pledges were encouraged to streak across campus and to grovel for cigarettes at a fraternity house. The result was severe enough to send one of the pledges to the hospital with minor burn injuries. The discovery of the incident caused investigations by the sorority and campus to be launched. The members who were involved with the incident were not charged by the state of Indiana with criminal recklessness under the hazing statute, as had been reported. They did, however, face a possible trial for alcohol possession but due to difficulty proving who provided the alcohol, the members were given community service instead. DePauw's reaction to the hazing for the chapter was to put the chapter on social probation until Fall 1999 and cut its pledge class in half for two years. The thirteen members who had either been involved with the incident or had known about it were given one-semester suspensions and social probation for their participation, and were voted by their chapter to retain membership within the chapter.

In 2014, the Kappa Kappa Gamma chapter at the University of Connecticut in Storrs, Connecticut, was kicked off campus until 2017 for forcing pledges to drink until they passed out, act like animals, and wiggle on the floor like "sizzling bacon".

In 2015, the Kappa Kappa Gamma chapter at Ohio State University in Columbus, Ohio was suspended for initiation rituals that involved heavy consumptions of alcohol.

In 2020, the Kappa Kappa Gamma chapter at Indiana University Bloomington in Bloomington, Indiana, was suspended for hazing and misconduct. One pledge reported to authorities she and about 50 other pledges were escorted to a basement, where senior members of the sorority were clad in lingerie intimidating them and pranked them thinking they had to perform oral sex on fraternity members or do a line of cocaine. One senior member of the sorority allegedly stated, "they (pledges) were lucky they didn't have to do anything worse as pledges for a top-tier sorority."

Bruce Ivins
Bruce Ivins, the senior bio-defense researcher at United States Army Medical Research Institute of Infectious Diseases (USAMRIID), before allegedly being driven to suicide by allegations that he was the "sole perpetrator of the 2001 anthrax attacks", reportedly had a "long and strange obsession" with Kappa Kappa Gamma, as well as with other sororities such as Chi Omega. Ivins reportedly became obsessed with Kappa when he was rebuffed by a woman in the sorority during his days as a student at the University of Cincinnati. The letters containing anthrax spores (which eventually killed 5 people and injured dozens more) were mailed from a drop box approximately 300 feet from a KKG storage facility at Princeton University, and only 60 feet from the KKG office. A US Government investigative panel, called the Expert Behavioral Analysis Panel, issued a report in March 2011 which detailed more of Ivins' obsession with the sorority. According to the panel's report, Ivins tormented sorority member Nancy Haigwood at the University of North Carolina. Ivins stole her notebook, which documented her research for her doctoral studies, and vandalized her residence.

Membership

In order to join Kappa Kappa Gamma, potential new members (PNMs) must be enrolled at a college or university with an active chapter of the fraternity. They must also have a minimum grade point average to be considered eligible. Women must participate in sorority recruitment and if they are issued an invitation to join, they enter the New Member period, the first of three phases of membership. After six to eight weeks, New Members are initiated and enter the second phase of membership as active collegiate members. Upon graduation, members enter the third and final phase of membership and become alumnae. Alumnae have the opportunity to join local alumna associations and remain active participants in fraternity life by engaging in social and philanthropic events, volunteering as advisers to collegiate chapters, and serving as fraternity council officers.

Collegiate chapters

 Kappa Kappa Gamma has chartered a total of 161 chapters, 30 of which the fraternity has closed. Eight of the 30 closed chapters have been rechartered, and none of the rechartered chapters have been closed.
 Active chapters exist in 41 of the 50 states and Washington, D.C. as well as in three of the 10 Canadian provinces.
 The state with the largest number of active chapters is California, with 17 active chapters and one inactive chapter. Kappa has had active chapters at all nine of the University of California undergraduate campuses.
 The fraternity's most expansionary year was 1929, with six new chapters chartered.
 The fraternity's most expansionary decades were the 1980s, in which 19 chapters were chartered, and the 1920s, in which 18 chapters where chartered and one chapter was rechartered.
 The fraternity's least expansionary decades were the 1890s, in which five chapters were chartered and one chapter was rechartered, and the 1960s, in which six chapters were chartered.
 The decade with the largest number of chapter closures was the 1880s, with six chapters closed.

Notable alumni

References

External links

 Official website
 Association Websites of Kappa Kappa Gamma

 
1870 establishments in Illinois
Companies based in the Columbus, Ohio metropolitan area
Monmouth College
National Panhellenic Conference
Student organizations established in 1870
Student societies in the United States